Carving a Life is a 2017 American romance drama film directed by Terry Ross and written by Lisa Bruhn. The film stars Tyler Bruhn and Karenssa LeGear.

Plot
Mitch (Tyler Bruhn), a woodworker struggling with alcoholism after the death of his mother, begins a relationship with Lauren (Karenssa LeGear), a local elementary schoolteacher. His past trauma and difficult relationship with his father strains his romantic relationship with Lauren.

Cast

Tyler Bruhn as Mitch
Karenssa LeGear as Lauren
Aaron Landon Bornstein as Stephen
Lisa Winans as Rebecca
Sandi Todorovic as Eric
Jay Jee as Dr. Johnson
Laura Bohlin as Mary
Navid Negahban as Dr. Kasem
Tiffany Espensen as Veronica
Lindsay Kaye Sainato as Lyndsey
Marla Bingham as Rehab Psychologist
Kathleen Holt as Nurse Mary
Max Baroudi as Young Mitch
Samuel James Pfoser as Young Eric
Kellen Rose as Kid at beach
Mark Benjamin as Ethan
Frank Papia as Gordon

Production

It was the debut film of director Terry Ross. Principal photography took place in North County of San Diego, Anaheim and Julian, California.

Release

The film was presented at the American Film Market. The film had a screening in San Diego, a limited theatrical release in Los Angeles and was distributed by Indie Rights.

Reception
The film received mixed to negative reviews from critics. Katie Walsh at Los Angeles Times described it as well-intentioned but amateurish, calling it "the kind of DIY indie film that tries very, very hard but completely misses the mark." Adam Keller at Film Threat scored it 1 out of 5 stating it was "stream-of-consciousness mush." Chris Olson at UK Film Review scored it 4 stars calling it "genuinely moving [...] tender and engaging." Occhi Magazine rated the film 3 stars and said it would've been better with an "expanded plot and more focus on the characters."

References

External links
 
 
 

2017 romance films
2017 romantic drama films
American romantic drama films
Films shot in San Diego
Films set in San Diego
2017 directorial debut films
Films about alcoholism
Films about grieving
Films about father–son relationships
Films directed by Terry Ross
2010s English-language films
2010s American films
Films about educators